Davis County is a county in northern Utah, United States. As of the 2010 United States Census, the population was 306,479, making it Utah's third-most populous county. Its county seat is Farmington, and its largest city is Layton.

Davis County is part of the Ogden-Clearfield, UT Metropolitan Statistical Area as well as the Salt Lake City-Provo-Orem, UT Combined Statistical Area.

History
The legislature of the provisional State of Deseret defined the county in an October 5, 1850 act, which also designated Farmington as the seat due to its location midway between boundaries at the Weber River on the north and the Jordan River on the south. It was named for Daniel C. Davis, a captain in the Mormon Battalion. The county boundaries were altered in 1852, 1854, 1855, and in 1862. In 1880 the county gained part of the islands and waters of Great Salt Lake that had previously been attached to Salt Lake County. The county boundary has remained unchanged since that time.

During its first 50 years, Davis County grew slowly. With the advent of the Utah Central Rail Road in 1870, a transition to mechanized agriculture and a surge of commerce, banking, improved roads, new water systems, and electrification of homes began. However, by 1940, the population was barely 16,000.

With the establishment of Hill Air Force Base in northern Davis County and southern Weber County, there was a surge in civilian employment after World War II. The county doubled in population between 1940 and 1950 and doubled again between 1950 and 1960 as part of the nationwide suburb boom that was occurring at the time. By 1990 there were 188,000 residents, and in 2000, there were 239,000. By 2030, the county is expected to have a population of about 360,000.

Geography
It is Utah's smallest county by land area and second smallest by total area.

Davis County includes Antelope Island, the lake's largest island. The entire island is a state park, designated to protect natural scenery and especially wildlife on the island, which includes bighorn sheep, pronghorn, and a bison herd.

The inhabited portion of Davis County between the lake and the mountain range is called the Wasatch Front, a narrow stretch of land that restricts north-south transportation in the county.

Adjacent counties

 Weber County - north
 Morgan County - east
 Salt Lake County - south
 Tooele County - west
 Box Elder County - northwest

Protected areas

 Antelope Island State Park
 Crystal West Unit Farmington Bay (part)
 Farmington Bay Waterfowl Management Area
 Howard Slough Waterfowl Management Area
 Wasatch-Cache National Forest (part)

Lakes

 Adams Reservoir
 Farmington Bay
 Hobbs Reservoir
 Holmes Reservoir

Climate
Davis County lies in a semiarid climate zone. Snow is frequent during winter, with up to  annually on high bench areas in the east and at least  on the valley floor. Summers are hot, with several days each year averaging above . However, the humidity is low, making for comparatively comfortable temperatures. In winter, temperatures sometimes drop below , but rarely for extended periods of time. Compared to Salt Lake County to the south, the weather in Davis County is extreme. Lake-effect snows hit the southern portion of the county harder, and even in non-lake-effect storms, the lack of a rain shadow in Davis County (much of Salt Lake County lies in the rain shadow of the Oquirrh Mountains) means that storms often hit Davis County harder. In addition, canyon winds from the east can sometimes cause devastating wind damage, and wind gusts above  have been reported. This occurs when a powerful high pressure system is over Wyoming, and is a frequent occurrence. Extreme wind events, however, seem to have declined in frequency in recent years.

Demographics

As of the 2010 United States Census, there were 306,479 people, 93,545 households, and 76,205 families in the county. The population density was 1,025/sqmi (396/km2). There were 97,570 housing units at an average density of 320.95 per square mile (123.66/km2). The racial makeup of the county was 90.04% White, 1.21% Black or African American, 0.46% Native American, 1.77% Asian, 0.59% Pacific Islander, 3.24% from other races, and 2.69% from two or more races. 8.42% of the population were Hispanic or Latino of any race.

There were 93,545 households, out of which 45.1% had children under the age of 18 living with them, 67.99% were married couples living together, 9.59% had a female householder with no husband present, and 18.54% were non-families. 15.23% of all households were made up of individuals, and 5.27% had someone living alone who was 65 years of age or older. The average household size was 3.24 and the average family size was 3.63.

The county population contained 37.23% under the age of 20, 6.56% from 20 to 24, 28.13% from 25 to 44, 19.92% from 45 to 64, and 8.15% who were 65 years of age or older. The median age was 29.2 years. For every 100 females, there were 100.85 males. For every 100 females age 18 and over, there were 97.09 males.

Law and government

A three-member board of commissioners is the county's governing body. The commissioners are elected to staggered four-year terms. They are responsible for all county services and operations. They approve, adopt, and amend the budget; they also serve as the legislative body and regulate business licensing in the county's unincorporated areas. The county commissioners (as of 2021) are:

 Randy B. Elliott, vice chair (term ends January 6, 2025)
 Lorene Miner Kamalu (term ends January 9, 2023)
 Bob J. Stevenson, chair (term ends January 9, 2023)

Other elected offices include the County Attorney, Assessor, Clerk/Auditor, Sheriff, Recorder, Surveyor, and Treasurer.

 The assessor is responsible for the valuing of all real property in the county. The current assessor is Dale Peterson (as of March 2018).
 The clerk/auditor serves as the county's chief financial and budget officer. The current Clerk/Auditor is Curtis Koch (as of March 2018).
 The treasurer is responsible for collection and investing of county funds. The current Treasurer is Mark Altom (as of March 2019).

Davis County voters are traditionally Republican. In no national election since 1948 has the county selected the Democratic Party candidate (as of 2020).

Economy
Davis County is often characterized as a bedroom community. According to the Census Bureau's 2004 American Community Survey, 42.3% of the population work in another county. South Davis County commuters who work in Salt Lake County frequently encounter commuting time traffic bottlenecks between Davis and Salt Lake Counties. The Legacy Parkway and the FrontRunner commuter rail project were built to alleviate this problem.

The commuter rail stations in the county have spurred plans for extensive transit-oriented development (TOD), including the Station Park development in Farmington.  Farmington is also the home of the Lagoon Amusement Park, the primary amusement park on the Wasatch Front.

Davis County's largest employer is Hill Air Force Base. Earnings of civilians at Hill AFB are almost double the state average. Hill AFB accounts for about 12% of the economy of Davis County and about 2.6% of the economy of Utah. Hill AFB provides employment for nearly 23,000 military and civilian personnel (approximately 4,500 active duty, 1,200 reservists, 13,000 federal civil servants, and 4,000 civilian contractors). Other large employers include Davis School District, Lagoon Amusement Park, and Lifetime Products.

Education
Public education in Davis County is provided by the Davis School District. There are currently 59 elementary schools, 16 junior high schools, 9 high schools, and 3 alternative schools in the school district. The high schools are as follows, showing where they are located:

 Bountiful High School - Bountiful
 Clearfield High School - Clearfield
 Davis High School - Kaysville
 Layton High School - Layton
 Northridge High School - Layton
 Syracuse High School - Syracuse
 Farmington High School - Farmington
 Viewmont High School - Bountiful
 Woods Cross High School - Woods Cross

The campus of Davis Technical College is in Kaysville.

Utah State University owns and operates the Utah Botanical Center in Kaysville, which includes an education center. Weber State University also operates campuses in Layton and Farmington.

Transportation
The most important road in the county is Interstate 15, which runs north–south through the center of the county. US-89 enters parallel to I-15 from Salt Lake County to the south and runs north through North Salt Lake and Bountiful as a city road before merging with I-15. It re-emerges in Farmington near the Lagoon Amusement Park, heading along the eastern benches on the slopes of the Wasatch Range, entering Weber County near South Weber. The Utah Department of Transportation is currently (2019) upgrading US-89 to a freeway through eastern Layton north to its interchange with I-84 near the Weber County border. Congestion is a significant problem in the county, as east–west transportation is restricted by the narrow urban corridor and many of its citizens commute south to Salt Lake County.

To relieve congestion in the county, the Legacy Parkway began construction in 2006. Construction began near the US-89/I-15 interchange in Farmington in 2004, but was soon halted due to a lawsuit filed by environmentalists, who were concerned that the road would harm marshlands along the eastern edge of the Great Salt Lake. They requested an independent evaluation for completeness of the environmental impact statement. A settlement was reached in 2005 and the final injunction was lifted in 2006. The Legacy Parkway opened in 2008, running from the US-89/I-15 interchange in Farmington southward to connect with I-215 near the border with Salt Lake County. An extensive trail system, wetland protection measures, and landscaping were implemented along the highway in response to the environmentalist's concerns, in addition to a lower speed limit and a ban of semi-trailer trucks on the highway. However, this compromise will expire in 2020, and the roadway is expected to begin functioning under normal Interstate System regulations (i.e. trucks and higher speed limits allowed).

In 2008, the Utah Transit Authority opened the FrontRunner commuter rail line from Salt Lake City north to Ogden, serving the length of Davis County with stations in Woods Cross, Farmington, Layton, and Clearfield.

Major highways

  Interstate 15
  Interstate 84
  Interstate 215
  U.S. Route 89
  State Route 67 - Legacy Parkway
  State Route 68 - Redwood Road
  State Route 193 - Bernard Fisher Highway

Communities

Cities

 Bountiful
 Centerville
 Clearfield
 Clinton
 Farmington
 Fruit Heights
 Kaysville
 Layton
 North Salt Lake
 South Weber
 Sunset
 Syracuse
 West Bountiful
 West Point
 Woods Cross

Townships
 Mutton Hollow

See also

 List of counties in Utah
 National Register of Historic Places in Davis County, Utah

References

Further reading

External links

 
 Davis County Visitor and Relocation Guide, Davis Chamber of Commerce

 
1850 establishments in Utah Territory
Populated places established in 1850
Ogden–Clearfield metropolitan area
Wasatch Front